The 2022 Carlton Football Club season is the Carlton Football Club's 159th season of competition.

It was the club's men's team's 126th season as a member of the Australian Football League, and the first under new senior coach Michael Voss. The club finished ninth with a 12–10 record, just barely missing the finals on percentage by 0.6%pts – its best performance since 2013, but also a disappointing finish after having been positioned third with an 8–2 record halfway through the season. Carlton players won both of the league's major individual awards for the season: Patrick Cripps winning the Brownlow Medal as fairest and best, and Charlie Curnow winning the Coleman Medal as leading goalkicker with 64 goals.

Due to a change to the AFL Women's timing in the calendar year, the club's women's team contested two distinct seasons as part of the 2022 campaign. In the 2022 AFL Women's season, held between January and April, the team finished eighth out of fourteen teams with a record of 4–6; and in the AFL Women's season seven, held between August and November, the team finished fourteenth out of eighteen teams with a record of 2–6–2 – thereby missing the finals in both seasons.

The club also fielded its men's reserves team in the Victorian Football League and its state level women's team in the VFL Women's.

Club summary
The 2022 AFL season will be the 126th season of the VFL/AFL competition since its inception in 1897; and, having competed in every season, it will also be the 126th season contested by the Carlton Football Club. The club will also field its women's team in the sixth and seventh seasons of the AFL Women's competition, its men's reserves team in its fifth Victorian Football League season, and its women's reserves team in its fourth VFL Women's season.

In a change from the previous seven seasons, Carlton's primary home ground will be Marvel Stadium and secondary home ground will be the Melbourne Cricket Ground, with the team playing six home games at the former and five at the latter. Traditional home ground Ikon Park will continue to serve as the training and administrative base, and as the home ground for AFL Women's and the men's reserves matches.

Car manufacturer Hyundai, which had been a major sponsor of the club continuously since 2008, and Great Southern Bank which became a major sponsor during the 2021 season, continued as the club's major sponsors through the 2022 season. The club's final membership tally for the season was a new club record of 88,776, making it the fifth consecutive season that a new club record membership had been set. The club's average home crowd of 49,784 was the highest in the league, and the club returned a net operating profit was $3.4 million, up $2 million on 2021.

Senior personnel
Early in the 2021 season, a change in the presidency was announced, with club director and former PriceWaterhouseCoopers CEO Luke Sayers taking over from eight-year president Mark Lo Giudice immediately after the end of the 2021 season. As part of the transition, and in response to the club's weaker than expected start to the 2021 season, a comprehensive review of the club's football department was undertaken in the second half of 2021, which was conducted by Sayers, CEO Cain Liddle, and external panel members Matthew Pavlich, Geoff Walsh and Graham Lowe. Following the report, a wide range of senior personnel changes were made at the club. Sayers officially became president on August 17, 2021, one round before the 2021 season's end.

Chief among the changes was the sacking of senior coach David Teague, after two seasons of his initial three year contract. Although his 21–29 win–loss record bettered those of his two predecessors (Mick Malthouse's 19–32–1 and Brendon Bolton's 16–61), interviews conducted during the review found Teague's coaching methods and gameplan were supported by only 30% of the club's players and staff, with that support heavily slanted towards the younger players. The review found that the gameplan focussed too heavily on attack at the expense of defense, was confusing for the players to execute, and that he was frequently outcoached by opposing coaches.

Teague was replaced with Michael Voss, who was signed to a three-year contract. The club made well publicised overtures to long-time senior coaches Alastair Clarkson ( 2005–2021) and Ross Lyon ( 2007–2011 and  2012–2019) as part of its search, with both declining the role.

The review also identified deficiencies in the leadership, experience and development capabilities of the coaching staff.

There were also several changes at the club's administrative level. Four new additions were made to the club's board of directors: former player Greg Williams (as football director), Lincoln Indicators co-founder Tim Lincoln, communications strategist Lahra Carey and JPMorgan Australia and New Zealand chairman Robert Priestly; Jeanne Pratt, Chris Townshend and football director Chris Judd all departed.

Onfield, Sam Docherty stepped aside from the co-captaincy and leadership group, doing so to focus on his recovery from treatment for testicular cancer with which he was diagnosed in August 2021. Docherty had served as co-captain with Patrick Cripps for the previous three seasons. Cripps will continue as co-captain, with Sam Walsh and Jacob Weitering serving as vice-captains and no broader leadership group named.

Squad for 2022
The following is Carlton's squad for the 2022 season.

Statistics are correct as of end of 2021 season.

For players: (c) denotes captain, (vc) denotes vice-captain.
For coaches: (s) denotes senior coach, (cs) denotes caretaker senior coach, (a) denotes assistant coach, (d) denotes development coach, (m) denotes managerial or administrative role in a football or coaching department

Additionally, under the league's 2022 Covid-19 policies, twenty players from the club's reserves list were nominated as top-up players, who would have become eligible to play senior football in the event that the club's primary list was reduced below 28 players due to isolation requirements for Covid-19 positive players. These top-up players were: Ned Cahill, Alex Cincotta, Josh Cripps, Ben Crocker, Jesse Glass-McCasker, Luke Goetz, Hugh Hamilton, David Handley, Will Hayes, Cody Hirst, Tyreece Leiu, Michael Lewis, Zavier Maher, Tom North, Stefan Radovanovic, Oliver Sanders, Matt Shannon, Cooper Stephens, Joel Trudgeon and Toby Wooller. None were called upon during the year.

Playing list changes
The following summarises all player changes which occurred after the 2021 season. Unless otherwise noted, draft picks refer to selections in the 2021 National Draft.

For the second consecutive season, the club lost two of its four most experienced players to retirement at the end of the previous season: Marc Murphy retired after 300 games, and Eddie Betts retired after 350 games (218 for Carlton). The club also unexpectedly lost full back Liam Jones to early retirement in November, after he declined comply with the league mandates related to the COVID-19 vaccine for all players; he was the first AFL men's player to retire over the vaccine.

The club was almost inactive during the draft, bringing in only one new player through the drafts and making its other additions through trades and other channels.

In

Out

List management

Season summary

Pre-season
The club played two full-length practice matches in the lead-up to the season. The match against Melbourne was scheduled as part of the 2022 AAMI Community Series, and the match against St Kilda was arranged between the clubs.

Premiership season
Carlton's 2022 season opened strongly. The club won its first three games – it had opened its last nine seasons 0–2 – and went on to sit with an 8–2 record after ten rounds. Particular praise went to the club's midfield, which dominated clearances for much of the first half of the season, buoyed in part by recruits Adam Cerra and George Hewett and strong form by others.

The second half of the season saw a more challenging fixture, with six out of twelve games against the eventual top six. The middle phase of the year also saw the club struggle with injuries to key defenders, in all suffering the unplanned absences of seven key defenders, including Liam Jones' retirement, Caleb Marchbank suffering an injury in his first game back after two years of injuries and Sam Durdin – recruited in the midseason draft specifically to cover the club's key defender injury list – also injured on debut for the club. Nevertheless, the club kept in touch with a top four chance, and after alternating wins and losses over an eight week period sat seventh with a 12–6 record after Round 19.

Entering the final month of the year, Carlton needed only one win or draw to secure a finals berth, and failed to secure it in Round 20 with an upset loss against eventual 14th-placed . Against Brisbane, Carlton trailed late in the third quarter by 58 points; an eight-goal final quarter narrowed the margin to as close as 15 points before eventually losing by 33. In a close match against  in which the margin never exceeded two goals, Carlton secured an 8-point lead in the 30th minute, before two late goals to Melbourne – the last with 11 seconds remaining – resulted in a 5-point loss. Finally against Collingwood, Carlton kicked eight goals to one in the third quarter to open a 24-point three-quarter time lead, before conceding 5.1 to 0.6 in the final quarter to lose by one point. The result saw Carlton become the first team since Carlton's 1977 team to miss the finals, after spending every week of the year in a finals position on the ladder.

Across the entire season, Carlton's record against the top six (who finished with 15 or more wins) was 2–6, including three losses by less than a goal; against the middle six (who finished with 10–13½ wins), its record was 3–3; and against the bottom six (8 wins or fewer), its record was 7–1, the sole loss coming against Adelaide. The 12–10 record was Carlton's best since 2011, and its finishing position of 9th was its best since 2013.

Notable events
Round 1: Carlton won its first match against  since the 2013 Elimination Final, ending an 11-game losing streak. It was the end of Carlton's longest ever losing streak against Richmond.
Round 1: Carlton won its annual Round 1 match against  for the first time since 2012.
Round 13: Essendon hosted Carlton in a match which commemorated the 150th anniversary of Essendon's establishment.

Individual awards and records

John Nicholls Medal
The Carlton Football Club Best and Fairest awards night took place on 30 September 2022.

John Nicholls Medal
The winner of the John Nicholls Medal was Patrick Cripps, who polled 181 votes to win the award for the fourth time in his career, joining John Nicholls (5) and Bruce Doull (4) as the club's only four-time winners. 2016 winner Sam Docherty finished second with 173 votes, and 2021 winner Sam Walsh was third with 163 votes.

Other awards
The following other awards were presented on John Nicholls Medal night:-
Best Young Player – Corey Durdin
Best Clubman – Nic Newman
Spirit of Carlton Award – Sam Docherty
Bill Lanyon Inner Blue Ruthless Award – Patrick Cripps
Carltonians William A. Cook Award – Patrick Cripps
Coaches' Award – Patrick Cripps
Players' Award – Patrick Cripps

Brownlow Medal
Patrick Cripps won the 2022 Brownlow Medal. He polled 29 votes to finish one vote ahead of second-placed Lachie Neale (Brisbane). It was Cripps' first Brownlow Medal. He became the sixth Carlton player to win the award, and the first since Chris Judd in 2010.

Cripps established outright favouritism for the award early in the season after being the stand-out in a number of early season games dominated by the Carlton midfield; and indeed by Round 8 he had polled 16 votes from only six full games played; but, with leaner returns through the middle part of the season, he drifted to third favourite behind Neale and Clayton Oliver (Melbourne) by the time of the count. His chance at the medal almost came to an end in Round 20 when he was suspended by the Match Review Panel and AFL Tribunal for rough conduct in a front-on contest against ' Callum Ah Chee, which would have ruled him ineligible and seen him miss the final rounds in which he polled the winning votes; but, Carlton had successfully had the suspension overturned by the AFL Appeals Board.

Leading goalkickers 
Charlie Curnow won the Coleman Medal as the league's leading goalkicker in the home-and-away season for the first time in his career; and Carlton's leading goalkicker for the second time, having previously won it in 2018. Curnow kicked 64 goals, which was the most by any Carlton player in a season since Brendan Fevola kicked 89 goals in 2009. His Coleman Medal was achieved in his first full season after missing more than two seasons with a series of knee injuries – he had not played a senior game between Round 15, 2019 and Round 20, 2021.

McKay finished second, as he and Curnow combined for more than 100 goals as key forwards in the same forward line. Patrick Cripps and Zac Fisher were next as goalkicking midfielders, followed by Jack Silvagni as a third tall forward.

Other awards
Honorific teams
All-Australian team – three Carlton players were named in the 2022 All-Australian team: Patrick Cripps at rover, whose selection was the third of his career and who was named vice-captain of the team; Adam Saad at half-back flank, for the first time in his career; and Charlie Curnow in the forward pocket, also for the first time. Sam Walsh and Jacob Weitering were also named in the extended 44-man squad.
22under22 team – two Carlton players – Sam Walsh and Adam Cerra – were named in the 22under22 team for the 2022 season. It was Walsh's fourth selection, and he was named vice-captain of the team; it was Cerra's third selection, the first two occurring while he was at Fremantle.

Statistical leaders
Adam Saad led the league in running bounces for the second consecutive season, with 113,  his tally more than doubling that of his nearest rival.

Club records
Round 7 – Three minutes into the game, Jack Carroll on debut kicked a goal with his first career kick.
Round 23 – Patrick Cripps recorded 27 contested possession, setting a new Carlton Football Club record and breaking the previous record of 25 shared by Chris Judd (2011) and Cripps (2018).
Lewis Young recorded 217 one-percenters for the season, setting a new Carlton Football Club record and breaking Sam Rowe's 2016 record of 215. He also twice set the club's game record for one-percenters, recording 22 in Round 14 against  and 25 in Round 22 against , breaking Rowe's record of 19; the latter matched Harris Andrews' league record, set in 2018.
Patrick Cripps' Brownlow Medal and Charlie Curnow's Coleman Medal marked the second time Carlton players had won both awards in the same year; the first occurred in 1961 when John James won the Brownlow Medal and Tom Carroll won the Coleman Medal.

Australian Football Hall of Fame
Mike Fitzpatrick was inducted into the Australian Football Hall of Fame during the 2022 season. Fitzpatrick played 150 for Carlton from 1975 until 1983, playing in the 1979, 1981 and 1982 premierships and captaining the club from 1980 to 1983, and was then a club director from 1989 until 1995.  Inducted in the administrator category, both his playing and administration careers were celebrated upon his induction.

AFL Women's

2022 AFL Women's season
Squad
The club's women's squad saw four prominent departures between seasons. Co-captain Katie Loynes and equal club games record holder Alison Downie (39 games) were both delisted, joining  and  respectively.

Carlton gained inaugural GWS player Jessica Dal Pos as part of the Harris trade, the club's only experienced recruit for the season. Annie Lee, Keeley Sherar, Brooke Vickers and Imogen Milford joined the club through the draft.

The club's 2022 AFL Women's season is given below. Numbers in parentheses represent games played and goals kicked in the season.

Season
Carlton finished eighth out of fourteen for the 2022 AFL Women's season, with a 4–6 win-loss record, to miss the finals. The club's form was overall consistent with its finishing position, with an 0–6 record against the top six teams – its best result in those games being a one point loss against second-placed Melbourne – and a 4–0 record in the four matches played against other bottom eight teams.

Notable events
Round 2: Carlton's originally fixtured match against  in Maroochydore was cancelled at two days notice, as Brisbane had too many players isolating for COVID-19 field a team. Carlton was redrawn to play , whose original opponent  was unable to play for the same reason.
Round 3: Carlton's originally fixtured match against  at VU Whitten Oval was cancelled at three days notice, the Bulldogs still unable to field a team. Carlton was redrawn to play  at Metricon Stadium on the following Tuesday night, which was now available to field a team and whose opponent original  was unable to play.
Round 7: St Kilda's score of 0.2 (2) set a new record as the lowest score conceded by Carlton in an AFLW game, and tied the lowest score by any team in AFLW history.
Round 8: Darcy Vescio became the first player to kick 50 career AFLW goals.

League awards
Mimi Hill was the winner of the AFL Women's Rising Star award.
One Carlton players was selected in the All-Australian team: Kerryn Harrington, who was selected on the interchange bench. Two other players were named in the 40-woman squad: Mimi Hill and Breann Moody.

Club Awards
Madison Prespakis won the club's best and fairest award, polling 60 votes to finish ahead of Kerryn Harrington (57 votes) and Mimi Hill (54 votes).
Kerryn Harrington won the Most Valuable Bluebagger award.
Daisy Walker won the coaches' award.
Paige Trudgeon won the Rookie of the Year award.

AFL Women's season seven
Squad
The women's squad saw a large number of prominent departures between seasons – two-time best and fairest Madison Prespakis and former All-Australian squad member Georgia Gee both joined the fledgling  team, and the club lost five experienced players to trades: former All-Australian Nicola Stevens four-year player Charlotte Wilson inaugural player Lauren Brazzale, three-year player Grace Egan, and first year player Courtney Jones. Brooke Vernon was delisted.

Four players added through the draft were: Keeley Skepper (pick No. 17), Mia Austin (pick no. 18), Lily Goss (pick No. 48) and Jessica Jones (pick No. 67).

The club's AFL Women's season seven squad is given below. Numbers in parentheses represent games played and goals kicked in the season.

Season
Carlton finished fourteenth out of eighteen for the 2022 AFL Women's season, with a 2–6–2 record, finishing fourteen points out of the finals, its worst performance since 2018's wooden spoon. The team's record was 0–4 against the top eight clubs, 2–2–1 against the clubs between 9th and 13th, and 0–0–1 in its only game against a bottom four team.

League awards
One Carlton player was selected in the All-Australian team: Breann Moody, who was selected as first ruck – it was Moody's second time selected to the team. One other player was named in the 42-woman squad: Vaomua Laloifi.

Club Awards
Mimi Hill won the club's best and fairest award, polling 86 votes to finish ahead of Abbie McKay (84 votes) and Breann Moody (61 votes).
Vaomua Laloifi won the Most Valuable Bluebagger award.
Lucy McEvoy won the coaches' award.
Keeley Skepper won the Rookie of the Year award.

Reserves
Carlton fielded reserves teams in the men's and women's competitions during the 2022 season.

Men's
Carlton's men's reserves team contested its fifth VFL season; and its 85th overall season of reserves and state level competition dating back to 1919.

Daniel O'Keefe continued as the reserves coach for his second season. VFL-listed players newly signed to the team included former AFL senior players Ned Cahill, Will Hayes; former rookie player Jesse Glass-McCasker (Carlton); father-son prospect Charlie McKay (son of Andrew McKay); Carlton's offseason train-on players Josh Cripps and Tyreece Leiu; and Luke Goetz, Hugh Hamilton, David Handley, Michael Lewis, Charlie McKay, Mitchell Moschetti, Darcy Porter, Oliver Sanders, Hamish Sinnott, Archie Stevens and Joel Trudgeon. Retained from the 2021 squad were Zane Barzen, Alex Cincotta, Ben Crocker, Aaron Gundry, Cody Hirst, Owen King, Tom North, Stefan Radovanovic, Matt Shannon, Cooper Stephens, Lachlan Swaney and Toby Wooller. Matt Shannon, who was co-captain with Ryley Stoddart in 2021, continued as sole captain in 2022.

The team finished 7th out of 21 in the home-and-away season, with an 11–7 win-loss record, to qualify for the finals. It was the first time Carlton's reserves team or reserves affiliate (the Northern Bullants) had reached the finals since 2011. Like the senior team, the Carlton reserves had to win a final round game against  to secure its finals position, doing so by ten points in a curtain raiser to the senior game. Carlton faced Collingwood again the following week, winning the elimination final comfortably. They were then eliminated in the semi-final by Brisbane; after trailing by 32 points late in the third quarter, Carlton fought back, and scores were level with two minutes remaining before Brisbane kicked the last two goals and won by twelve points. As such, Carlton finished the season in 6th place. Senior listed player Paddy Dow won the reserves best and fairest.

Reserves finals matches

Women's
The club fielded a team in the VFL Women's competition for the fourth time. Carlton finished 9th out of 12 clubs to miss the finals, with a record of 4–9–1. The team was coached by Tom Stafford and captained by Ally Bild. Millie Klingbeil won the best and fairest.

References

Carlton Football Club seasons
Carlton
Carlton
Carlton